Zhou Xintong (born 1 January 1993) is a Chinese table tennis player. Her highest career ITTF ranking was 36.

References

1993 births
Living people
Chinese female table tennis players